The Pambamarca Fortress Complex consists of the ruins of a large number of pukaras (hilltop forts) and other constructions of the Inca Empire. The fortresses were constructed in the late 15th century by the Incas to overcome the opposition of the people of the Cayambe chiefdom to the expansion of the Incas in the Andes highlands of present-day northern Ecuador.

In 1998, Pambamarca was placed on the  tentative List of UNESCO World Heritage Sites.

The opponents

The Pais Caranqui. In the 15th century, the people of the Andes highlands of Ecuador north of Quito were organized into several chiefdoms, apparently similar in language and culture but competitive with each other and frequently engaged in internecine warfare.  The names of the most prominent chiefdoms were the Caranqui, Cayambe, Otavalo, and Cochasquí.  Pais Caranqui (Caranqui country) is the collective name often used to describe the chiefdoms, although the Caranqui may not have been the most powerful of them. The Cayambe were the primary defenders who faced the advance of the Incas at the Pambamarca Fortresses.  Scholars estimate the collective pre-Inca population of the chiefdoms was between 100,000 and 150,000. 

There is considerable confusion among scholars as to the pre-Columbian Andean people of northern Ecuador.  The Caranqui and other nearby people are often identified as the Cara people and with Cara culture and as descendants of the semi-mythical Quitu culture, from whence comes the name of the Ecuadorian capital of Quito.    

The Inca.  In the 1460s, as a military leader, the future emperor Topa Inca Yupanqui (ruled c. 1471-1493) may have begun the Inca conquest of Ecuador. He encountered stiff resistance from the Cañari but advanced as far as Quito during his reign.  His son Huayna Capac (ruled 1493-1525) would spend nearly all his reign completing the conquest of northern Ecuador of which the first major barrier to the Incas was probably the Cayambe defense at Pambamarca.

The battles at Pambamarca apparently extended over several years terminating in an Inca victory, possibly around 1505. The Incas then went on to complete the conquest of northern Ecuador, achieving a final victory over the Caranqui at Yawarkucha (Blood Lake), which may have occurred as late as 1520. In the 1530s the Incas were in turn conquered by the Spanish.

The archaeological site

Between the two sets of fortresses is one pukara of uncertain origin.

The best known and one of the largest fortresses is Quitoloma (hill of Quito). It is the southernmost of the Pambamarca fortresses, located at an elevation of  atop a small hill. The highest level of the site consists of an ushnu, a terraced platform used for religious ceremonies. The ushnu is surrounded by the remains of more than 100 buildings which served as living quarters, storehouses (qollqas), and administrative buildings. Quitoloma was probably an administrative center and had the dual purpose of persecuting the war against the Pais Caranqui and defending the city of Quito and the sacred site of El Quinche. Archaeologists have found weaponry and large caches of stones used by the Incas's principal long-range weapons of slings and bolas scattered along the inside faces of the walls. An Inca road ran from Quito by Quitoloma and continued eastward toward the lowlands of the Amazon basin.

References

Inca Empire
Archaeological sites in Ecuador
Pichincha Province
Tourist attractions in Pichincha Province